Vasilijević is a Serbian surname, a patronymic derived from the given name Vasilije.

Geographical distribution
As of 2014, 94.0% of all known bearers of the surname Vasilijević were residents of Serbia (frequency 1:4,198) and 5.4% of Montenegro (1:6,426).

In Serbia, the frequency of the surname was higher than national average (1:4,198) in the following districts:
 1. Moravica District (1:425)
 2. Zlatibor District (1:978)
 3. Rasina District (1:1,209)
 4. Zaječar District (1:1,313)
 5. Pomoravlje District (1:1,795)
 6. Šumadija District (1:1,927)

People
Goran Vasilijević (born 1965), Serbian footballer
Vladan Vasilijević, Serbian politician

See also
Vasiljević, surname
Vasilić, surname

References

Serbian surnames
Patronymic surnames
Surnames from given names